The 1959 season was the 54th season of competitive football in Norway.

Hovedserien 1958/59

Group A

Group B

Championship final
 June 21: Lillestrøm - Fredrikstad 2-2 (extra time)

Championship final Rematch
 August 5: Lillestrøm - Fredrikstad 4-1

Landsdelsserien

Group Østland/Søndre

Group Østland/Nordre

Group Sørland/Vestland, A

Group Sørland/Vestland, B

Group Sørland/Vestland, C

Group Møre

Group Trøndelag

Play-off Sørland/Vestland
 Bryne - Start 0-2 
 Start - Os 2-0 
 Os - Bryne 4-0

Play-off Møre/Trøndelag
 Hødd - Brage 2-3 
 Brage - Hødd 5-3 (agg. 8-5) 
 Brage promoted.

Third Division

District I
 1. Lisleby Promoted 
 2. Mysen 
 3. Gresvik 
 4. Askim 
 5. Tune 
 6. Hafslund 
 7. Kråkerøy 
 8. Torp

District II, group A
 1. Mjøndalen Play-off 
 2. Drammens BK 
 3. Åssiden 
 4. Geithus 
 5. Slemmestad 
 6. Røa 
 7. Tofte 
 8. Bjølsen

District II, group B
 1. Aurskog Play-off 
 2. Grue 
 3. Spartacus 
 4. Bjørkelangen 
 5. Ski 
 6. Sørli 
 7. Galterud 
 8. Furuset

District III, group A (Oplandene)
 1. Gjøvik/Lyn Play-off 
 2. Hamar IL Mesna 
 3. Gjøvik SK 
 4. Hamarkameratene 
 5. Brumunddal 
 6. Stavsjø 
 7. Vardal

District III, group B (Sør-Østerdal)
 1. Nybergsund Play-off 
 2. Elverum 
 3. Trysilgutten 
 4. Koppang 
 5. Innsats 
 6. Engerdal 
 7. Lørdalen

District III, group C (Sør-Gudbrandsdal)
 Kvam Play-off 
 Table unknown.

District III, group D (Nord-Gudbrandsdal)
 1. Dovre Play-off 
 2. Otta 
 3. Lesja 
 4. Dombås 
 5. Sel 
 6. Faukstad

District IV, group A (Vestfold)
 1. Ørn Play-off 
 2. Runar 
 3. Holmestrand 
 4. Tønsberg 
 5. Turn 
 6. Falk 
 7. Borre 
 8. Tønsbergkam. 
 9. Sem

District IV, group B (Grenland)
 1. Urædd Play-off 
 2. Kragerø 
 3. Storm 
 4. Skidar 
 5. Skiens-Grane 
 6. Herkules 
 7. Skiens BK 
 8. Borg

District IV, group B (Øvre Telemark)
 1. Snøgg Play-off 
 2. Rjukan 
 3. Skade 
 4. Drangedal 
 5. Ulefoss 
 6. Sportsklubben 31

District V, group A1 (Aust-Agder)
 1. Rygene Play-off 
 2. Dristug 
 3. Risør 
 4. Arendals BK 
 5. Froland 
 6. Trauma

District V, group A2 (Vest-Agder)
 1. Vindbjart Play-off 
 2. Mandalskam. 
 3. Lyngdal 
 4. Vigør 
 5. Torridal 
 6. Farsund disqualified

District V, group B1 (Rogaland)
 1. Vidar Play-off 
 2. Buøy 
 3. Vaulen 
 4. Klepp 
 5. Ålgård 
 6. Sandnes AIF

District V, group B2 (Rogaland)
 1. Kopervik Play-off 
 2. Jarl 
 3. Randaberg 
 4. Åkra 
 5. Varhaug 
 6. Nord

District V, group C (Sunnhordland)
 1. Odda Play-off 
 2. Stord 
 3. Halsnøy 
 4. Solid 
 5. Rubbestadnes 
 6. Skånevik

District VI, group A (Bergen)
 1. Fjellkameratene Play-off
 2. Djerv
 3. Trane
 4. Laksevåg
 5. Bergens-Sparta
 6. Minde
 7. Viggo

District VI, group B (Midthordland)
 1. Fana Play-off 
 2. Erdal 
 3. Follese 
 4. Florvåg 
 5. Voss 
 6. Kjøkkelvik

District VII, group A (Sunnmøre)
 1. Skarbøvik Play-off 
 2. Herd 
 3. Spjelkavik 
 4. Rollon 
 5. Ørsta 
 6. Velled./Ringen 
 7. Bergsøy 
 8. Stranda

District VII, group B (Romsdal)
 1. Nord-Gossen Play-off 
 2. Eidsvåg (Romsdal) 
 3. Træff 
 4. Åndalsnes 
 5. Isfjorden 
 6. Eide 
 7. Olymp

District VII, group C (Nordmøre)
 1. Braatt Play-off 
 2. Framtid 
 3. Bjørn 
 4. Nordlandet 
 5. Sunndal 
 6. Goma 
 7. Enge 
 8. Halsa

District VIII, group A1 (Sør-Trøndelag)
 1. Ranheim Play-off 
 2. Flå 
 3. Vikavarvet 
 4. Heimdal 
 5. Melhus 
 6. Støren

District VIII, group A2 (Sør-Trøndelag)
 1. Løkken Play-off 
 2. Svorkmo 
 3. Troll 
 4. Orkanger 
 5. Rindal 
 6. Nor

District VIII, group B (Trondheim og omegn)
 1. Rosenborg Play-off 
 2. Tryggkameratene 
 3. Trond 
 4. Trondheims/Ørn 
 5. National 
 6. Nidar 
 7. Nidelv 
 8. Rapp

District VIII, group C (Fosen)
 1. Stadsbygd Play-off 
 2. Beian 
 3. Fevåg 
 4. Brekstad 
 5. Opphaug 
 6. Hasselvika 
 7. Uthaug withdrew

District VIII, group D (Nord-Trøndelag/Namdal)
 1. Snåsa Play-off 
 2. Stjørdals/Blink 
 3. Fram (Skatval) 
 4. Namsos 
 5. Malm 
 6. Bangsund 
 7. Sprova 
 8. Aasguten

District IX
 1. Bodø/Glimt 
 2. Mo 
 3. Stålkameratene  
 4. Brønnøysund 
 5. Mosjøen 
 6. Sandnessjøen

District X
 1. Harstad 
 2. Tromsø 
 3. Narvik/Nor 
 4. Mjølner 
 5. Lia-Brage 
 6. Bardufoss/Omegn

Play-off District II
Mjøndalen - Aurskog 1-0 
Aurskog - Mjøndalen 0-2 (agg. 0-3) 
Mjøndalen promoted.

Play-off District III
Kvam - Dovre 6-0 
Nybergsund - Kvam 3-0 
Dovre - Nybergsund 3-5

Nybergsund - Gjøvik/Lyn 0-4 
Gjøvik/Lyn - Nybergsund 13-0 (agg. 17-0) 
Gjøvik/Lyn promoted.

Play-off District IV
Ørn - Urædd 4-4 
Urædd - Snøgg 0-0 
Snøgg - Ørn 2-1

Play-off District V
Vindbjart - Rygene 3-1 
Rygene - Vindbjart 0-7 (agg. 1-10) 
Vindbjart promoted.
Kopervik - Vidar 1-0 
Vidar - Kopervik 4-4 (agg. 4-5) 
Kopervik promoted.
Vidar - Odda 3-0 (in Haugesund) Vidar promoted.

Championship District V
Vindbjart - Kopervik not played

Play-off District VI
Fjellkameratene - Fana 4-5 
Fana - Fjellkameratene 6-1 (agg. 11-5) 
Fana promoted.

Play-off District VII
Skarbøvik - Nord-Gossen 6-1 
Nord-Gossen - Braatt 1-5 
Braatt - Skarbøvik 4-2

Play-off District VIII
Ranheim - Løkken? 
Snåsa - Stadsbygd 2-2 
Rosenborg - Ranheim 1-2 
Rosenborg - Snåsa 6-1 
Ranheim - Stadsbygd 5-0 
Ranheim - Snåsa 5-4 
Stadsbygd - Rosenborg 0-5

Norwegian Cup

Final

Northern Norwegian Cup

Final

National team

Note: Norway's goals first
Explanation:
 F = Friendly
EC = European championship
OGQ = Olympic Games Qualifier

 
Seasons in Norwegian football